The E Line (formerly the Expo Line from 2012–2019) is a  light rail line that runs between Downtown Los Angeles and Santa Monica. It is one of the seven lines in the Los Angeles Metro Rail system and is operated by the Los Angeles County Metropolitan Transportation Authority (Metro). The line opened in 2012.

The E Line largely follows the right-of-way of the former Pacific Electric Santa Monica Air Line. Passenger service ended in 1953; freight-only service ended by March 1988. Several E Line stations are built in the same location as Air Line stations, although no original station structures have been reused.

Originally named the Expo Line after Exposition Boulevard, along which it runs for most of its route, the line was renamed the E Line in late 2019, while retaining the aqua-colored line and icons used to designate it on maps. When the Regional Connector is complete in 2023, the current E Line will be joined with the Eastside portion of the L Line to create an extended E Line, which will be colored yellow on maps.

Service description

Hours and frequency

Speed 
It takes 46 minutes to travel the line's 15.2 mi (24.5 km) length, at an average speed of 19.8 mph (31.9 km/h), making it the slowest line in the system.

Station listing 

The following is the complete list of stations, from west to east:

Ridership

History 

The E Line largely follows the right of way used by the Los Angeles and Independence Railroad steam railroad, built in 1875, which was converted by Pacific Electric to electric traction and operated as the Santa Monica Air Line by 1920, providing both freight and passenger service between Los Angeles and Santa Monica. Passenger service ended in 1953, and freight service stopped in 1988.

Local advocacy groups including Friends 4 Expo Transit supported the successful passage of Proposition C in 1990, which allowed the purchase of the entire right-of-way from Southern Pacific by Metro. In 2000, an urban art group called Heavy Trash placed signs advertising a fictional "Aqua Line." The signs, with the text "Coming Soon," showed a subway route extending along Wilshire to the ocean, with 10 station stops. Although the campaign was a hoax, it demonstrated newfound support and revealed the frustrations surrounding the lack of rail service connecting Santa Monica and the Westside with Downtown Los Angeles. Metro released a Major Investment Study in 2000 which compared bus rapid transit and light rail transit options along what was now known as the "Mid-City/Exposition Corridor".

Construction 

An independent agency, the Exposition Metro Line Construction Authority, was given the authority to plan, design, and construct the line by state law in 2003. After construction of the second phase was completed, the line was handed over on January 15, 2016, to the Los Angeles County Metropolitan Transportation Authority.

The line was built in two phases; the first phase comprised the  section between Downtown Los Angeles and Culver City.  Construction began in early 2006, and most stations opened to the public on April 28, 2012. The Culver City and Farmdale stations opened on June 20, 2012.

Design and construction on the  portion between Culver City and Santa Monica started in September 2011. Testing along the phase 2 segment began on April 6, 2015, and the segment opened on May 20, 2016.

Future developments

Regional Connector 

The Regional Connector is an under-construction light-rail subway corridor through Downtown Los Angeles that is to connect the current A and E Lines to the current L Line and to allow a seamless one-seat ride between the A and E Lines' current 7th Street/Metro Center terminus and Union Station.

Once the Regional Connector is completed, the alignment of the L (formerly Gold) Line will be split into two parts at Little Tokyo/Arts District station, with the portion north of this station joined to the A Line, extending it to connect Long Beach with Azusa. The alignment east of Little Tokyo/Arts District station will be assigned to the E Line, extending it to connect Santa Monica and East Los Angeles directly. At this time, the L Line will cease to exist as a separate line.

In 2019, Metro began using a renaming system where each rail and bus rapid transit line was rebranded with a letter name and an associated color to be used on maps and other wayfinding signs. As a result, the Expo Line became the E Line in 2019, and will be recolored from aqua to yellow upon completion of the Regional Connector.

The groundbreaking for the project took place on September 30, 2014, and the alignment is expected to be in public service by early 2023.

Eastside Transit Corridor 

The Eastside Transit Corridor is a project to extend from the former L Line's terminus at Atlantic station eastward to Lambert station in Whittier. Partially funded by Measure M, construction is programmed to start in 2029 with service beginning in 2035, though the project may be accelerated for the 2028 Summer Olympics.

Operations

Maintenance facilities 
Previously, the light rail vehicles used on the E Line were maintained at the division 11 yard in Long Beach, California, the same maintenance facility that is used by the A Line. However, the new division 14 yard, located east of Stewart Street and north of Exposition Boulevard in the vicinity of the 26th Street/Bergamot station in Santa Monica, was opened with the completion of Phase 2.

Rolling stock 

Compatible with the rest of Metro's light-rail network, the E Line shares standard Metro light rail vehicles (Kinki Sharyo P3010) with the A Line. Metro estimates that it has 47 light rail cars to provide service on the E Line under the peak-hour assumption of 3-car trains running at 6-minute headways.

Bike pathways 

The E Line Bike Path parallels the route of the light rail line and includes a mixture of bike lanes on Exposition Boulevard and off-street paths alongside the rail tracks.

Incidents 

 On November 29, 2018, a pedestrian was struck and killed. The man had been attempting to cross the tracks.
 On January 15, 2019, a passenger fell from the platform between the cars and was dragged to death. They "have not yet been able to identify the individual as pieces of the victim's body are spread out."
 On May 2, 2019, a man climbed a nearby construction crane and jumped to his death at the Expo/Sepulveda station, landing on the tracks and temporarily halting transportation. Graphic footage of the incident was spread on social media websites, most notably Reddit.

References

External links 

Los Angeles County Metropolitan Transportation Authority (Metro)
BuildExpo (Exposition Metro Line Construction Authority)
Extensive Collection of Construction Photos

E Line (Los Angeles Metro)
Light rail in California
Public transportation in Los Angeles
Public transportation in Los Angeles County, California
Central Los Angeles
South Los Angeles
Westside (Los Angeles County)
Railway lines opened in 2012
Rail trails in California
2012 establishments in California